The Royal Victoria Marathon, formerly known as the GoodLife Fitness Victoria Marathon or RVM, is a marathon race held on Vancouver Island in Victoria, British Columbia, Canada every October. It was first held in 1980 and was started by Robin Pearson, Alex Marshall and Bruce "Gunner" Shaw.

In 2006, the full marathon saw 1863 participants. The event also features a half marathon, 8K and 1.2K kids run and attracts nearly 10,000 competitors annually in all races. The full marathon is a certified Boston Marathon qualifier.

Two course records were set at the 2011 edition of the race: Thomas Omwenga ran a men's record of 2:14:33 hours and Lucy Njeri Muhami improved the women's record to 2:37:56 hours. Canada's Cindy Rhodes is the most successful athlete historically at the race, having won six times between 1991 and 2000. Kelvin Broad is a five-time winner, having taken consecutive wins from 1994 to 1998. Thomas Howard, Phil Nicholls, Steve Osaduik and Suzanne Evans have each won the Victoria Marathon on three separate occasions.

Results
Key:

See also
 List of marathon races in North America

References

External links
 Official Website

Marathons in Canada
Sports competitions in Victoria, British Columbia
Recurring sporting events established in 1980
Fall events in Canada